City of Washington referred to the District of Columbia up to 1871.  Other uses of the phrase include:

 City of Washington (ship), American merchant steamship commissioned in 1877
 City of Washington Pipe Band, a grade two pipe band located in Washington, D.C.